Cats & Dogs is the third studio album by Australian band, Mental As Anything. It was released in September 1981, produced by Bruce Brown and Russell Dunlop, the album peaked at #3 on the Australian chart and #2 on the New Zealand Album charts. 

At the 1981 Countdown Music Awards, the album was nominated for Best Australian Album.

Cats & Dogs was released in the USA and Europe as If You Leave Me, Can I Come Too?.

In October 2010, Cats & Dogs was listed in the top 50 in the book, 100 Best Australian Albums having previously been listed in similar polls in the music magazines Rolling Stone, Juice and The Edge.

Recording
Greedy Smith claimed this was their first "proper" album: "With the first one, we didn't know what we wanted or what we should sound like, and the second one just got away from us all together. This time, we put our foot down with the record company and said we wanted more time. We were able to put tracks down, then leave them and think about them."

Reception
AllMusic said, "the Mentals created their first true 'classic' album, which takes the best elements from their debut album and betters them by leaps and bounds. Everyone in the band shines on this album, from Martin Plaza's warm drawl to Reg Mombassa's amazing slide fretwork and Greedy Smith's confident and playful keyboards."

Rip It Up agreed the album was, "generally acknowledged as the Mentals' most accomplished album, where their diverse ideas came together consistently."

Cash Box magazine reviewed the revised American version of the album called If You Leave Me Can I Come Too?, which has a slightly different track listing.  They claimed "This album of down under 'punk funk and beatnik rockabilly' is actually  selections from two previously released gold Aussie albums and a peppy single produced by Elvis Costello entitled 'I Didn't Mean to Be Mean'. Look for AOR, pop and progressive play on these shores, especially in the wake of the success of antipodean peers Men At Work."

Track listing

Australian & New Zealand Editions

Canadian edition 
The Canadian edition of Cats & Dogs dropped the album's final five tracks ("Chemical Travel", "Catalina's Reward", "Psychedelic Peace Lamp", "Sad Poetry", and "Hararei I Akarana"), and added two earlier singles ("The Nips Are Getting Bigger", and "Egypt", both of which had originally appeared on Get Wet.)

US edition 
The American edition of Cats & Dogs, re-titled If You Leave Me, Can I Come Too?, dropped four tracks ("Chemical Travel", "Catalina's Reward", "Psychedelic Peace Lamp", and "Hararei I Akarana"), and added "The Nips Are Getting Bigger", "Egypt", and the newly recorded single "I Didn't Mean to Be Mean" (produced by Elvis Costello).

UK and European edition 
The UK and European edition of Cats & Dogs was resequenced, remixed and re-titled If You Leave Me, Can I Come Too?.  It included all tracks from the Australian edition ("Harerei I Akarana" was renamed "Holiday in Auckland"), and added "I Didn't Mean to Be Mean".  All the tracks were remixed by Dunlop and Brown, in some cases resulting in significantly different timings from the tracks on the original Australian/NZ release.  Also note that the version of "I Didn't Mean to Be Mean" included on this album uses a different vocal take than the Australian single mix.

Personnel

Musicians
 Martin Plaza — lead vocals, guitar    
 Greedy Smith — lead vocals, keyboards, harmonica
 Reg Mombassa — guitar, vocals  
 Peter O'Doherty — bass, guitar, vocals 
 Wayne de Lisle – drums

Recording details 
 Bruce Brown — Producer, Engineer 
 Russell Dunlop — Producer, Engineer

Charts

Year-end charts

Certifications and sales

Release history

References 

1981 albums
Mental As Anything albums
Regular Records albums